Mehmet Fesa Evrensev (1878, Istanbul - 9 April 1951, Istanbul) was the first Turkish Ottoman aircraft pilot and the first president of Turkish Airlines.

Biography 
Fesa Evrensev was born in 1878 in the Gedikpaşa neighborhood of Istanbul. He entered the Military Academy after Galatasaray High School and graduated as a Cavalry Lieutenant in 1899. He passed the exam in first place to become a pilot in 1911 and was sent to France to take flight training. After returning to the Ottoman Empire in 1912, he served as a fleet commander during a number of flight missions in the Balkan War. During World War I, he was stationed in the Caucasus Front. On his way to the Caucasus, the ship he boarded in the Black Sea, off the coast of Amasra, was attacked by the Russians. All those on the sunken ship were taken prisoner by the Russians. His captivity lasted for about five years in Siberia, and he escaped to return home in June 1920. He participated in the Turkish War of Independence and was stationed on the Eastern Front and on the Western Front before the Great Offensive. Later, he was appointed as a teacher to the Air Academy in Izmir. He retired in November 1925.

In 1933, he was appointed as the manager of the Turkish State Airlines, Turkey's first air transport organization and predecessor to Turkish Airlines. A year later, he was assigned to the Turkish Aeronautical Association.

Fesa Bey, Turkey's first pilot, died on April 9, 1951 and was buried in the Karacaahmet Cemetery in the Üsküdar district of Istanbul.

See also 
 Ahmet Ali Çelikten
 Bedriye Tahir Gökmen
 Sabiha Gökçen
 Vecihi Hürkuş

References 

1878 births
1951 deaths
Turkish aviators
Turkish Air Force personnel
Turkish Airlines
Aviation pioneers